The Elks Club was a historic clubhouse building located at Parkersburg, Wood County, West Virginia. It was designed by architect William Howe Patton and built in 1903.  It was a four-story, three-bay by six-bay wide, red brick building with terra cotta trim in the Classical Revival style.  The first two stories were faced in smooth dressed stone, and feature arched apertures, with central consoles.  It was occupied by the Parkersburg Lodge #198, Benevolent and Protective Order of Elks (B.P.O.E.)

It was listed on the National Register of Historic Places in 1982. The building was by the Parkersburg News & Sentinel and demolished in 2005. It is now used as a parking lot.

References

Buildings and structures in Parkersburg, West Virginia
Clubhouses on the National Register of Historic Places in West Virginia
Neoclassical architecture in West Virginia
Buildings and structures completed in 1903
Elks buildings
Clubhouses in West Virginia
Demolished buildings and structures in West Virginia
National Register of Historic Places in Wood County, West Virginia
Buildings and structures demolished in 2005